TYLin is a global, multi-disciplinary infrastructure services firm. Headquartered in San Francisco, TYLin established its business in the design of long-span bridges and specialty structures.

The firm provides a range of planning, design, construction and project management services to the aviation; bridge; facilities; mobility, planning, and management; ports and marine; rail and transit; and surface transportation industries. TYLin operates from more than 50 regional centers across four continents, and employs a professional staff of more than 3,000 engineers, planners, architects and scientists.

History

1950s: T.Y. Lin International was founded on June 1, 1954, by Tung-Yen Lin, a Chinese-American structural engineer recognized worldwide as an innovator in bridge design, engineering, and construction. Lin is credited with standardizing the practical use of prestressed concrete. He is also known for his emphasis on the structural aesthetics aspect of engineering, regardless of a project's economic limitations.

1960s1970s: Lin continued to expand his firm's specialty in prestressed concrete to broader consulting services, with projects that included conventionally reinforced concrete, structural steel, masonry, and timber-framed structures. In 1967, he designed the 18-story shear wall Bank of America building in Managua, Nicaragua. The reinforced concrete tower was one of only two structures left standing after the country's 1972 earthquake. Lin also became known for his design innovations, such as the Rio Colorado Bridge, an upside-down suspension bridge spanning a deep gorge in Costa Rica. In the early '70s, the firm also established offices in Taiwan and Singapore.

1980s: T.Y. Lin International expanded with new offices in Kuala Lumpur and a merger with Maine-based Hunter-Bellow Associates in the U.S. In 1986, when U.S. President Ronald Reagan presented Lin with the National Medal of Science, he responded by handing the former president a detailed plan for a  “Intercontinental Peace Bridge” connecting Alaska and Siberia across the Bering Strait. In 1989, T.Y. Lin International was acquired by the Dar Group, an international network of professional service firms located in 45 countries.

1990s: Following the Loma Prieta earthquake in California in late 1989, T.Y. Lin International helped in the development of advanced techniques, engineering tools, and design standards for bridge assessment, the seismic retrofit of existing structures, and the design of new bridges.  The firm also completed several acquisitions, including California-based McDaniel Engineering, Chicago-based BASCOR, Washington State's DGES Consulting Engineering, and New York's DRC Consultants. Additionally, the firm opened a new Asia-Pacific office in Chongqing, China.

2000s: U.S. expansion continued with the acquisition of Miami-based H.J. Ross Associates, Inc., Northern California's CCS Planning and Engineering, multi-location FRA Engineering and Architecture, and Medina Consultants on the East Coast. The acquisitions strengthened the firm's services in the areas of ITS/traffic engineering and transportation engineering through its aviation and rail and transit line of businesses for such projects as Miami International Airport's expansion project. In Asia, T.Y. Lin International oversaw the design of major bridges in China's fast-growing central region, including the Shibanpo Bridge and the Caiyunba Bridge in Chongqing, and the Second Wujiang Bridge in Fulin.

2010s: T.Y. Lin International oversaw the design of 25 elevated bridges across Taiwan for the island's new High Speed Rail system and the Hoover Dam Bypass Bridge, which is downstream of the Hoover Dam; the Port Mann Bridge in British Columbia; Canada (2012); the new Eastern Span of the San Francisco-Oakland Bay Bridge (2013) and the Champlain Bridge, Montreal (2019-present), also called the Samuel De Champlain Bridge, in Montreal, Quebec, Canada.

Services

TYLin provides services on all phases of project development and delivery, including:
 Construction Engineering
 Construction Support and Inspection
 Design
 Design-Build
 Intelligent Transportation Systems
 Planning
 Program Management

Industries

TYLin provides services within all major sectors of the infrastructure industry, including:
 Airports
 Bridges
 Buildings
 Federal Facilities
 Land Development
 Ports & Marine
 Rail & Transit
 Roadway Systems
 Water Systems

Projects

Select project list:
 Arizona Veterans Memorial ColiseumPhoenix, Arizona
 Arthur Ravenel Jr. BridgeCharleston, South Carolina
 Automated People Mover Guideway, Orlando International AirportOrlando, Florida
 Bataan–Cavite Interlink BridgeManila Bay, Philippines
Bayshore Bikeway – San Diego, California
 Brookfield Floating Bridge (Sunset Lake Floating Bridge) Brookfield, Vermont
 Caijia BridgeChongqing, China
 Caiyuanba Yangtze River BridgeChongqing, China
 California High-Speed RailCentral Valley Line
 California Incline Bridge and Idaho Avenue Pedestrian Overcrossing  Santa Monica, California
 Champlain Bridge, Montreal (2019-present),(Samuel De Champlain Bridge) Montreal, Quebec, Canada
 Cermak-McCormick Place stationChicago, Illinois
Jamuna Bridge Tangail and Sirajganj, Bangladesh
 Cinta Costera - Panama City, Panama
 Chicago Transit Authority (CTA) Red Line ModernizationChicago, Illinois
CTA Blue Line Station Improvements – Chicago, Illinois
Red Line (CTA) and Purple Line (CTA) Modernization – Chicago, Illinois
 Dublin Link – Dublin, Ohio
 Egongyan Rail Transit Bridge – Chongqing, China
 El Dorado International Airport  Bogota, Colombia 
 Elgin-O’Hare Western Access Project, Illinois Route 390  DuPage and Cook Counties, Illinois
 Eller Drive and Intermodal Container Transfer Facility (ICTF) Overpass - Broward County, Florida
 4th Bridge over the Panama CanalPanama City, Panama
 I-25/Cerrillos Road Diverging diamond interchangeSanta Fe, New Mexico
I-395 Miami Corridor Reconstruction – Miami, Florida
I Street Bridge Replacement – Sacramento, California
Interstate 10/Jefferson Street Interchange - Indio, California
Joliet Gateway Center – Joliet, Illinois
Kenneth F. Burns Memorial Bridge - Lake Quinsigamond, Central Massachusetts
Los Angeles International Airport, Los Angeles World Airports Utility and Landside Access Modernization Program Enabling Project – Los Angeles, California
 Miami International AirportMiami, Florida
 Mike O'Callaghan – Pat Tillman Memorial Bridge (Hoover Dam Bypass Bridge)Arizona-Nevada
 Navy Pier Flyover Lakefront Trail Improvements – Chicago, Illinois
 Niagara Falls State Park Rehabilitation – Niagara Falls, New York
Panama Metro Line 1 - Panama City, Panama
Panama Metro Line 2 - Panama City, Panama
Port of Miami Tunnel – Miami, Florida
Port Mann Bridge – Vancouver, BC, Canada
Puente Centenario - Panama CanalRepublic of Panama
 Rex T. Barber Veterans Memorial BridgeJefferson County, Oregon
 San Francisco–Oakland Bay Bridge New East Span (Bay Bridge)Oakland, California
 Sellwood BridgePortland, Oregon
 Sidney Lanier BridgeBrunswick, Georgia
Sheikh Jaber Al-Ahmad Al-Sabah Causeway – Kuwait
South Carolina Aeronautical Training Center for Trident Technical College – N. Charleston, South Carolina
 Taiwan Taoyuan International AirportTaipei, Taiwan
 The EsplanadeTheatres on the BaySingapore
 Tilikum Crossing, Bridge of the PeoplePortland, Oregon
 Tocumen International Airport Expansion Program - Panama City, Panama
Twin River Bridges – Chongqing, China
 Victoria Theatre and Concert HallSingapore
 Wacker Drive ReconstructionChicago, Illinois
 United States Military Academy  West Point, New York

See also

References

External links
 

Companies based in San Francisco